Catherine Maliev-Aviolat (born 20 March 1970) is a Swiss diver. She competed at the 1992 Summer Olympics and the 2000 Summer Olympics.

References

External links
 

1970 births
Living people
Swiss female divers
Olympic divers of Switzerland
Divers at the 1992 Summer Olympics
Divers at the 2000 Summer Olympics
Place of birth missing (living people)